Megan Anderson, also known as Megan McWilliams and previously known as Megan Dehn, is a former Australia netball international and current netball coach. Between 2000 and 2006 she made 20 senior appearances for Australia. She was a member of the Australia team that won the silver medal at the 2006 Commonwealth Games. During the Commonwealth Bank Trophy era, Anderson was a member of Sydney Swifts teams that won premierships in 2001, 2004, 2006 and 2007. During the ANZ Championship era, she played for Southern Steel and Northern Mystics. After retiring as a player in 2011, she became a coach. In 2020 Anderson was appointed head coach of Queensland Firebirds.

Early life, family and education
Anderson was raised in Woy Woy, New South Wales. Her mother was a netball umpire and Anderson began played netball, aged 8, with the St John the Baptist netball club and the Woy Woy Peninsula Netball Association at Ettalong Beach. Between 1991 and 1992, Anderson attended Corpus Christi College. She is the mother of twins, born c.2014. Anderson is married to Mark McWilliams.

Playing career

New South Wales
Between 1992 and 1995, Anderson represented New South Wales in the Australian National Netball Championships. In 1992 she featured at under-19 level. Between 1993 and 1995 she played at under-21 levels.

Mobil Superleague
In 1994, Anderson played for the Australian Institute of Sport in the Mobil Superleague.

Commonwealth Bank Trophy
During the Commonwealth Bank Trophy era, Anderson made 141 appearances, playing 519 quarters and scoring 2507 goals. She played for Sydney Sandpipers, Adelaide Ravens and Sydney Swifts.

Sydney Sandpipers
In 1998 Anderson made 13 appearances for Sydney Sandpipers.

Adelaide Ravens
In 1999 Anderson made 17 appearances for Adelaide Ravens. Together with Michelle den Dekker, she was a member of the Ravens team coached by Patricia Mickan that finished the season as overall runners up. In the grand final, Anderson scored 17 from 30 as Ravens lost  62–30 to Adelaide Thunderbirds.

Sydney Swifts
During two spells with Swifts, Anderson made 111 appearances. She was a member of Sydney Swifts teams that won premierships in 2001, 2004, 2006 and 2007. Her team mates at Sydney Swifts included Briony Akle, Jane Altschwager, Catherine Cox and Liz Ellis. Between 2001 and 2005, she played in four grand finals for Swifts.

New Zealand

Northern Force
In 2006 and 2007, Anderson played for Northern Force in the National Bank Cup. During the breaks in the New Zealand competition, Anderson travelled back to Australia to play for Sydney Swifts in the Commonwealth Bank Trophy. She was the first player to feature in both competitions at the same time.  In 2007, Anderson was a member of the Northern Force team that were defeated by Southern Sting in the last National Bank Cup grand final.

Southern Steel
Between 2008 and 2010, Anderson played for Southern Steel in the ANZ Championship.  Anderson was originally a member of the 2008 New South Wales Swifts squad but subsequently withdrew and joined Steel. In 2009, Netball New Zealand initially blocked Anderson from playing for Steel because she was not a New Zealand citizen and wasn't eligible to represent the New Zealand national netball team. She subsequently agreed to play for Queensland Firebirds, but later withdrew from the team, citing work commitments. However, in June 2009 she was permitted to re-join Steel as a replacement for the pregnant Daneka Wipiiti. She then played for Steel in the final three rounds and the playoffs. She captained Steel during the 2010 season.

Northern Mystics
Anderson played for Northern Mystics during the 2011 ANZ Championship season. She had initially planned to continue playing for Southern Steel and was applying to become a New Zealand citizen. Meanwhile, Steel signed Natasha Chokljat, another Australia international. However, Anderson  failed to meet the residency requirements required for New Zealand citizenship and  Steel found themselves with two import players when they were only permitted to have one. Anderson considered retiring, but was persuaded by Mystics captain, Temepara George to move to Auckland for one last season. She was subsequently a member of the 2011 Northern Mystics team that were grand finalists and runners up in the ANZ Championship to Queensland Firebirds.

Grand finals

International

Australia
Between 2000 and 2006, Anderson made 20 senior appearances for Australia. Between 1994 and 1996 she had represented Australia at under-21 level. She made her senior debut on 23 November 2000 in an away match against South Africa. She was the first player to debut for Australia in the 21st century. Anderson was a member of the Australia team that won the silver medal at the 2006 Commonwealth Games.

World 7
In August 2009, Anderson played for a World 7 team, coached by Julie Fitzgerald, that defeated New Zealand 2–1 in an international test series. As winners of the series, the World 7 team were awarded the Taini Jamison Trophy.

Coaching career

Assistant Coach

Northern Mystics
After retiring as a player, Anderson was retained by Northern Mystics as a specialist coach for the 2012 ANZ Championship season.

New South Wales Swifts
Between 2014 and 2017, Anderson served as an assistant coach to Robert Wright at New South Wales Swifts. Specialising in attack, Anderson was part of the coaching team which led  Swifts to back-to-back ANZ Championship grand finals in 2015 and 2016.

Australia
Between 2017 and 2019, Anderson served as an assistant coach with Australia. Together with Robert Wright, she served as one of Stacey Marinkovich's assistants at the 2017 Fast5 Netball World Series. In 2018 and 2019, together with Clare Ferguson, she was an assistant to Lisa Alexander.

Head coach
In 2020, ahead of the 2021 Suncorp Super Netball season, Anderson was appointed head coach of Queensland Firebirds.

Honours
Australia
Commonwealth Games
Runners Up: 2006
World 7
Taini Jamison Trophy
Winners: 2009
Sydney Swifts
Commonwealth Bank Trophy
Winners: 2001, 2004, 2006, 2007
Runners up: 1998, 2003, 2005
Minor premierships: 2004, 2005, 2006
Northern Force
National Bank Cup
Runners up: 2007
Northern Mystics
ANZ Championship 
Runners up: 2011 
Individual Awards

References

1974 births
Living people
Australian netball players
Australia international netball players
Netball players from New South Wales
Netball players at the 2006 Commonwealth Games
Commonwealth Games silver medallists for Australia
Commonwealth Games medallists in netball
Australian Institute of Sport netball players
Sydney Sandpipers players
Adelaide Ravens players
Sydney Swifts players
Northern Force players
Southern Steel players
Northern Mystics players
Esso/Mobil Superleague players
ANZ Championship players
Australian expatriate netball people in New Zealand
Australian netball coaches
Suncorp Super Netball coaches
New South Wales Swifts coaches
Queensland Firebirds coaches
People from Gosford
Recipients of the Australian Sports Medal
People educated at St Peter's Catholic College, Tuggerah
Northern Mystics coaches
Medallists at the 2006 Commonwealth Games